Contamana District is one of six districts of the province Ucayali in Peru.

References

Districts of the Ucayali Province
Districts of the Loreto Region